The 2013 Erondegemse Pijl (Erpe-Mere) was a one-day women's cycle race held in Belgium, from Erpe to Erondegem. on August 3 2013. The tour has an UCI rating of 1.2. The race resulted in a clean sweep of the podium by Sengers Ladies Cycling Team, with Polspoel, de Vuyst and Majerus finishing first, second and third respectively.

References

2013 in Belgian sport
2013 in women's road cycling
Erondegemse Pijl